Maryland House of Delegates District 23B is one of the 67 districts that compose the Maryland House of Delegates. Along with subdistrict 23A, it makes up the 23rd district of the Maryland Senate. District 23B includes part of Prince George's County, and is represented by two delegates.

Demographic characteristics
As of the 2020 United States census, the district had a population of 93,196, of whom 73,820 (79.2%) were of voting age. The racial makeup of the district was 16,502 (17.7%) White, 64,293 (69.0%) African American, 341 (0.4%) Native American, 2,752 (3.0%) Asian, 11 (0.0%) Pacific Islander, 3,260 (3.5%) from some other race, and 5,999 (6.4%) from two or more races. Hispanic or Latino of any race were 6,208 (6.7%) of the population.

The district had 71,337 registered voters as of October 17, 2020, of whom 9,271 (13.0%) were registered as unaffiliated, 6,650 (9.3%) were registered as Republicans, 54,138 (75.9%) were registered as Democrats, and 1,060 (1.5%) were registered to other parties.

Past election results

2002

2006

2010

2014

2018

References

23B